Ala-ud-din Husain Shah ( (1494–1519) was an independent late medieval Sultan of Bengal, who founded the Hussain Shahi dynasty. He became the ruler of Bengal after assassinating the Sultan, Shams-ud-Din Muzaffar Shah, whom he had served under as wazir. After his death in 1519, his son Nusrat Shah succeeded him. The reigns of Husain Shah and Nusrat Shah are generally regarded as the "golden age" of the Bengal sultanate.

Origin and early life
There are several opinions regarding the origin of Alauddin Husain Shah. According to a 1788 chronicle, Riyaz-us-Salatin, Sayyid Husain Sharif Makki was the son of Sayyid Ashraf al-Husaini, a Sharif of Mecca, with al-Husaini suggesting descent from Husayn ibn Ali. An earlier work by Firishta also mentions Husain as a Sayyid and former inhabitant of Mecca. His father's name is backed up by numismatics as many of Husain's coins mention him as a son of Sayyid Ashraf al-Husayni. The coins of Husain's son Nasrat and grandson Firuz end with al-Husaini attached to Husain's name. In contrast, Husain's other son, Mahmud, ends his coin with his grandfather's name (Sayyid Ashraf al-Husaini).

The Riyaz-us-Salatin mentions Husain's father Sayyid Ashraf Al-Husaini later inhabiting Termez (in Turkestan) for a long period before settling in the Chandpur mouza of Rarh (western Bengal). Husain and his elder brother, Yusuf, spent their childhood studying under the local Qadi, who later married his daughter to Husain due to his noble background. Chandpur is often equated to the village of Chandpara in Murshidabad district, where a number of inscriptions can be founded during the early part of Husain's reign. Husain had also constructed the Kherur Mosque in Chandpara in the first year of his reign in 1494. A lake in this village, called Shaikher Dighi, is also associated with Husain. Krishnadasa Kaviraja, a Vaishnavist author born during Husain's reign, claims that Husain worked for Subuddhi Rai, a revenue officer in the erstwhile Bengali capital Gaur, and was severely whipped during the excavation of a lake. Local traditions in Murshidabad also claim that Husain was the rakhal (cow-keeper) for a Brahmin in Chandpara.

On the other hand, Francis Buchanan-Hamilton's writings make mention of a manuscript found in the former Bengali capital Pandua which labels Husain as a native of a village named Devnagar in Rangpur who seized an opportunity to redeem the throne of Bengal that his grandfather, Sultan Ibrahim, had held seventy years prior. There are local traditions in Rangpur which claim that he was indeed a native of that area. It is said that it was Jalaluddin Muhammad Shah who had ousted his grandfather Sultan Ibrahim, and as a result, Husain's father and family migrated to Kamata. Buchanan-Hamilton's manuscript is unnamed, and Momtazur Rahman Tarafdar considers the manuscript to have confused Husain Shah of Bengal with Husayn Shah Sharqi of Jaunpur, whose grandfather was Shamsuddin Ibrahim Shah Sharqi, a contemporary of Jalaluddin Muhammad Shah. Tarafdar, whose work is written in 1965, makes note that there was no Sultan of Bengal in that period by the name of Ibrahim. However, in the 1990s, coins of a Sultan of Bengal by the name of Nasiruddin Ibrahim Shah (r. 1415/16 - 1416/17) were discovered in Beanibazar, Sylhet which has opened discussion regarding this manuscript once again.

16th-century Portuguese explorer João de Barros mentions the story of a noble Arab merchant from Aden arriving in Chittagong with an army to aid the Sultan of Bengal in conquering Orissa. This merchant later killed the Sultan, thus becoming ruler of Bengal, and according to Heinrich Blochmann, Barros' narrative is in reference to Husain Shah. However, Alauddin Hussain Shah was already Sultan when the Portuguese arrived in the early 1500s. Barros' narrative would mean that Hussain came to power in the early 1400s, which was clearly not the case.  
Taking all of the theories into account, Nitish Sengupta asserts that Husain's mother was a Bengali.

Accession
Most sources are in agreement that Husain was appointed the Wazir (prime minister) of Sultan Shamsuddin Muzaffar Shah (r. 1490-1494). Initially, Husain secretly sympathized with the rebels but ultimately he put himself openly as their head and besieged the citadel, where Muzaffar Shah shut himself with a few thousand soldiers. According to the 16th-century historian Nizamuddin, the Sultan was secretly assassinated by Husain with the help of the paiks (palace-guards), which ended the Abyssinian rule in Bengal.

Reign

Husain Shah's long reign of more than a quarter of a century was a period of peace and prosperity, which was strikingly contrast to the period that preceded it. The liberal attitude of Husain Shah towards his Hindu subjects is also an important feature of his reign.

Initial administrative actions
Immediately after accession to the throne, Husain Shah ordered his soldiers to refrain from plundering Gaur, his capital city. But being annoyed with their continuous plundering, he executed twelve thousand soldiers and recovered the looted articles, which included 13,000 gold plates. Subsequently, he disbanded the paiks (the palace guards) who were the most significant agitators inside the palace. He removed all Habshis from administrative posts and replaced them with Turks, Arabs, Afghans and Bengalis.

Engagement with the Delhi Sultanate
Sultan Hussain Shah Sharqi, after being defeated by Bahlol Lodi, retired to Bihar, where his occupation was confined to a small territory. In 1494, he was again defeated by Sultan Sikandar Lodi and fled to Bengal, where he was granted asylum by Sultan Ala-ud-Din Husain Shah. This resulted in an expedition against Bengal in 1495 by Sultan Sikandar Lodi. Husain Shah of Bengal sent an army under his son Shahzada Danyal to fight with the Delhi army. The armies of Delhi and Bengal met at Barh near Patna. Sikandar Lodi halted the advance of his army and concluded a treaty of friendship with Ala-ud-din Husain Shah. According to this agreement, the country west of Barh went to Sikandar Lodi while the country east of Barh remained under Husain Shah of Bengal. The final dissolution of the Jaunpur Sultanate resulted in the influx of the Jaunpur soldiery in the Bengal army, which was further strengthened by it.

Kamata-Kamrup expedition

In 1498, Husain Shah's general Shah Ismail Ghazi led an expedition to the Kamata Kingdom in response to plea from Sachipatra, a defector whose son was executed by King Nilambar of Kamata. Husain Shah's army imprisoned Nilambar, pillaged the capital city and annexed the territory up to Hajo. His son, Shahzada Danyal, was subsequently made Governor of Kamata. The victory was publicly recorded in an inscription at Malda.

Odisha campaigns
According to the Madala Panji, Shah Ismail Ghazi commenced his campaign from the Mandaran fort (in the present-day Hooghly district) in 1508-9 and reached Puri, raiding Jajpur and Katak on the way. The Gajapati ruler of Orissa, Prataparudra was busy in a campaign in the south. On hearing this news, he returned and defeated the invading Bengal army and chased it into the borders of Bengal. He reached the Mandaran fort and besieged it, but failed to take it. Intermittent hostilities between the Bengal and Orissa armies along the border continued throughout the reign of Husain Shah.

Capture of Pratapgarh
When Gouhar Khan, the Bengali governor of Sylhet (in present-day Bangladesh) died, the district was seized by ruler of the neighbouring kingdom of Pratapgarh, Sultan Bazid. One of Husain Shah's nobles, a Hindu convert named Surwar Khan was sent to confront Bazid and when attempts at negotiations failed, fought against the Sultan and his allies. Bazid was defeated and captured and was forced to give heavy concessions in order to keep his kingdom, though under the suzerainty of Bengal. In reward for his actions, Surwar Khan was named the new governor of Sylhet and the defeated Sultan's daughter was given in marriage to his son, Mir Khan.

Expeditions to Tripura and Arakan
According to Rajmala, a late royal chronicle of Tripura, Husain Shah despatched his army four times to Tripura, but the Tripura army offered stiff resistance and did not yield any territory. But the Sonargaon inscription of Khawas Khan (1513) is interpreted by a number of modern scholars as an evidence of annexure of at least a part of Tripura by Husain Shah's army.

During Husain Shah's expeditions to Tripura, the ruler of Arakan helped Dhanya Manikya, the ruler of Tripura. He also occupied Chittagong and expelled Husain Shah's officers from there. In 1513, Husain Shah assigned the charge of Arakan expedition to Paragal Khan. Paragal Khan advanced from his base on the Feni River. After Paragal's death, his son Chhuti Khan took over the charge of the campaign until Chittagong was wrested from Arakanese control. The expedition of territory to the western bank of Kaladan river was placed under his governorship administration. The hostilities probably ended in 1516.

The Portuguese explorer, Vasco da Gama, arrived India by sea in 1498. Consequently, a Portuguese mission came to Bengal to establish diplomatic relations towards the end of Husain Shah's reign.

Cultural contribution

The reign of Husain Shah witnessed a remarkable development of Bengali literature. Under the patronage of Paragal Khan, Husain Shah's governor of Chittagong, Kabindra Parameshvar wrote his Pandabbijay, a Bengali adaptation of the Mahabharata. Similarly, under the patronage of Paragal's son Chhuti Khan, who succeeded his father as governor of Chittagong, Shrikar Nandi wrote another Bengali adaptation of the Mahabharata. Kabindra Parameshvar in his Pandabbijay eulogised Husain Shah. Bijay Gupta wrote his Manasamangal Kāvya also during his reign. He eulogised Husain Shah by comparing him with Arjuna (samgrame Arjun Raja prabhater Rabi). He mentioned him as Nrpati-Tilak (the tilak-mark of kings) and Jagat-bhusan (the adornment of the universe) as well. An official of Husain Shah, Yashoraj Khan, wrote a number of Vaishnava padas and he also praised his ruler in one of his pada. During Husain Shah's reign a number of significant monuments were constructed. Wali Muhammad built Chota Sona Masjid in Gaur.

During his reign, an Islamic scholar known as Shaykh Muhammad ibn Yazdan Bakhsh Bengali visited Ekdala where he transcribed Sahih al-Bukhari and gifted it to the Sultan in Sonargaon. The manuscript is currently kept at the Khuda Bakhsh Oriental Library in Bankipore, Patna, Bihar.

Religious tolerance
The reign of Husain Shah is also known for religious tolerance towards his subjects. However, R.C. Majumdar write that during his Orissa campaigns, he destroyed some Hindu temples, which Vrindavana Dasa Thakura has mentioned in his Chaitanya Bhagavata. However the destruction of the temples was not carried out by the orders of the Sultan himself. The celebrated medieval saint, Chaitanya Mahaprabhu and his followers preached Bhakti (Nath-Gopi) throughout Bengal during his reign. When Husain Shah learned of Chaitanya Mahaprabhu's huge following amongst his subjects, he ordered his qazis not to injure him in any way and allow him to go wherever he liked. Later, two high-level Hindu officers in Husain Shah's administration, his Private Secretary, (Dabir-i-Khas) Rupa Goswami and his Intimate Minister (Saghir Malik) Sanatana Goswami became devoted followers of Chaitanya Mahaprabhu. Gaudiya Vaishnavas consider him to be the incarnation of King Jarasandha.

Issue
Husain Shah had eighteen sons and at least eleven daughters. Among these are:
Shahzada Danyal: likely the eldest son. May have been killed at the end of the campaign on Kamata kingdom.
Shahzada Ali Shah, Nasiruddin Nasrat Shah: succeeded his father. Reigned as Sultan of Bengal from 1519 to 1532.
Shahzada Badar Shah: reigned as Sultan of Bengal from 1533 to 1538.
Raushan Akhtar Banu: possibly a granddaughter. Married Ibrahim Danishmand, a Sufi saint and landowner.

See also
 List of rulers of Bengal
 History of Bengal
 History of Bangladesh
 History of India
 Isa Khan

Notes

1519 deaths
Year of birth unknown
16th-century Indian monarchs
Hussain Shahi dynasty